Qadiyat or Qaziyat (alternative spellings: Kadiyat or Kaziyat) in Islam is a territorial division associated with a qadi; in some cases subordinate to the mufti and muftiate. In analogy to Christianity, a qadiyat would be considered a diocese.  

As Sunni Islam does not prescribe any formal hierarchy or priesthood, qadiyats are primarily found in European- and Central Asian Islamic organizations, particularly in south-eastern Europe and countries deriving from the former Soviet Union.    

In Russia and in other parts of the former Soviet Union, a muhtasibat is directly subordinate to a qadiyat.  

The Ottoman empire had a similar territorial division called a kadiluk, which was more concerned with justice and taxation than religion.

See also
 Qadi
 Mufti
 Muftiate
 Muhtasibat
 Mahallah

References 

Islamic legal occupations
Religious leadership roles